John Bond (5 April 1678 – 19 June 1744), of Tyneham in Dorset, was an English lawyer and politician who sat in the House of Commons from 1721 to 1744.

Early life
Bond was the second son of Nathaniel Bond, of Creech Grange, Dorset, a King's Serjeant and MP. His elder brother was Denis who was also an MP. He was admitted at Inner Temple to study law in 1697, and was called to the bar in 1706. He married his cousin, Margaret Williams (died 1775), daughter of John Williams of Herringston, Dorset on 19 March 1716.

Career
Bond was returned as a stop-gap Member of Parliament for Corfe Castle at a by-election on 25 February 1721 when his brother was the borough's other MP. He did not stand at the 1722 general election but replaced his brother, who became MP for Poole, at the 1727 general election.  He voted against the Government on the Hessians in 1730, but from then on supported the Government when present. In 1732, a report of a House of Commons committee named him as being involved with his brother in the fraudulent sale of the forfeited Derwentwater estates in 1723, but no action was taken. He was returned unopposed at the 1734 general election. In 1737, he was made a bencher of his Inn. He was returned unopposed for Corfe Castle again in 1741.

Death and legacy
Bond died on 19 June 1744. He and his wife had four sons and two daughters. Their son, John (1717–1784), was also an MP and, as his uncle's heir, became head of the family.

References

1678 births
1744 deaths
Politicians from Dorset
Members of the Inner Temple
Members of the Parliament of Great Britain for English constituencies
British MPs 1715–1722
British MPs 1727–1734
British MPs 1734–1741
British MPs 1741–1747